Hristo Nikolov (born 5 March 1980) is a Bulgarian footballer currently playing as a goalkeeper.

Nikolov previously made two appearances for Spartak Pleven and one appearance for Spartak Varna in the A PFG.

References

1981 births
Living people
Bulgarian footballers
PFC Spartak Varna players
FC Chernomorets Balchik players
PFC Dobrudzha Dobrich players
PFC Ludogorets Razgrad players
First Professional Football League (Bulgaria) players

Association football goalkeepers